Doron Weber (born 1955) is an American author best known for his memoir, Immortal Bird: A Family Memoir, and a foundation executive. Born on a kibbutz in Israel in 1955, he attended Forest Hills High School in Forest Hills, New York where he was elected 
senior class president.  Weber is a graduate of Brown University (B.A., 1977) and studied at the Sorbonne and Oxford University (M.A., 1981), where he was a Rhodes Scholar.   He has held positions at the Readers Catalog, Society for the Right to Die, The Rockefeller University, and the Alfred P. Sloan Foundation, where he has created seminal programs in science and the arts.

Immortal Bird 
Weber's memoir, Immortal Bird, the portrait of a teenager's short, vibrant life and the relationship between father and son, documents the family's navigation of the complex medical journey of Doron and Shealagh Weber's first child, Damon, who was born in 1988 with a congenital heart defect. The defect, a single ventricle, was successfully repaired, allowing him to lead a remarkably full life until he developed new complications as a teen. When he was 16, Damon received a successful heart transplant but then died of a post-transplant infection that was misdiagnosed as organ rejection and left untreated. The family brought suit in 2006 against New York-Presbyterian Hospital/Columbia University Medical Center where their son was a patient but, as of 2013, the suit remains unresolved. In addition to being named by The Washington Post as one of “50 Notable Works of Non-Fiction” for 2012,  Immortal Bird was listed as Amazon's Best Book of the Month,  in February 2012 Indie NEXT List, and was one of nine official selections of the 2013 Chautauqua Literary and Scientific Circle, the oldest book club in America. The paperback was published in February, 2013.

Alfred P. Sloan Foundation Work 
Since 1995, Weber has worked as a program director at the Alfred P. Sloan Foundation, a nonprofit philanthropic organization that supports research and education in science, technology, and economic performance. As Vice President, Programs, Weber runs the Public Understanding of Science and Technology Program where he pioneered the synergistic use of media and the arts to translate science for the public. He has launched national programs in theater, film and television that commission, develop, produce, and distribute new work bridging the two cultures of science and the humanities. Grantees include Manhattan Theatre Club, Sundance Film Institute, National Geographic Television, PBS, National Public Radio, BAM, and World Science Festival. Weber also directs the Foundation's efforts to promote Universal Access to Knowledge by using emerging developments in digital information technology to make the benefits of human knowledge and human culture accessible to people everywhere.  Grantees include Library of Congress, Internet Archive, Wikimedia Foundation, Harvard University and Digital Public Library of America. In 2012, Weber made a grant for a pilot meeting on rice science at the Lee Kuan Yew School of Public Policy that brought together scientists from India, Pakistan, Bangladesh, Sri Lanka, Nepal, Bhutan, and China.

Awards 
On behalf of the Foundation, he accepted the PBS Leadership Award for over a decade of support;  the Nielsen Impact Award for Film from the Hollywood Reporter (2009);  the Council of Foundation citation for “the visionary funding decisions of foundations in using media for their program goals” for a new web series, The Secret Life of Scientists (2010); and the Gold Communicator Award for a documentary about the Foundation's history, “Sloan at 75” (2011).  His work at Sloan has been profiled in The New York Times, The Boston Globe, Fortune, Filmmaker Magazine, and The American Way. Weber also won the National Book Award's Literarian Award for Outstanding Service in 2018.

Other civic work 
Weber serves as President of The Writers' Room Board of Trustees, Vice Chair of the Digital Public Library of America Steering Committee, Advisory Board Member of the  Science and Entertainment Exchange, and Board Visitor of the Wikimedia Foundation. From 1995 to 2005, he served as secretary of the New York State Committee for the Rhodes Scholarships. He also is a member of the Council on Foreign Relations and the Century Club.

Publications 
 Immortal Bird
 Final Passages (with Judith C. Ahronheim)
 The Complete Guide to Living Wills (with Evan R. Collins, Jr.)
 Safe Blood (with Joseph Feldschuh)
 
 “Boomers Rewrite Candidate Profiles,” LA Times, 1996
 “A Way Around Kevorkian,” USA Today, 1994
 “The Best and the Guiltiest,” The New York Times, 1993
 “BYOB,” Baltimore Sun, 1990

References 

Alfred P. Sloan Foundation people
1955 births
Living people
American male writers
Israeli emigrants to the United States
American Rhodes Scholars